This list includes notable management consulting firms.

Management consulting indicates both the industry of, and the practice of, helping organizations improve their performance, primarily through the analysis of existing business problems and development of plans for improvement.

Organizations hire the services of management consultants for a number of reasons, including gaining external (and presumably objective) advice and access to the consultants' specialized expertise.

 
Management consulting